Buddhism in Buryatia—a regional form of Buddhism.

The spread of Buddhism into Buryatia
Historical evidence gives reason to believe that, from the 2nd century BC, proto-Mongol peoples (the Xiongnu, Xianbei, and Khitans) were familiar with Buddhism. On the territory of the Ivolginsk Settlement, remains of Buddhist prayer beads were found in a Xiongnu grave.

At the beginning of the 17th century, Tibetan Buddhism penetrated northward from Mongolia to reach the Buryat population of Transbaikalia (the area just east of Lake Baikal). Initially, Buddhism disseminated primarily among the ethnic groups that had recently migrated out of Khalkha Mongolia (the Selenga and Zede Buryats). At the end of the 17th to the beginning of the 18th centuries, it spread throughout the Transbaikal region. A second branch came directly from Tibet, from the Labrang Monastery in Amdo.

The establishment of Buddhism

 In 1701 there were eleven dugans (small Buryat Buddhist temples) in Transbaikalia.
 In 1722 the border was delineated between Mongolia and Russia. Buryat tribes living nomadically in the northern part of Mongolia then became part of Russia. The Russian government closed off the border, induced the Buryat nomads to take on a relatively settled lifestyle, and made itself the authority on the region's religious matters.
 Buddhist monastic universities, called datsans, were built in Buryatia—including the one at Tsongol, completed in the early 1740s.
 In 1741 Empress Elizabeth (Yelizaveta Petrovna) adopted a decree recognizing the existence of a "lamaist faith": She legally recognized the existence of eleven datsans, and with them 150 lamas. Buddhism was formally accepted as an official religion in the Russian Empire. (In July 1991 the Buddhists of Buryatia commemorated 250 years of official recognition of their religion).
 For a long time in Buryat Buddhism there was a struggle for dominance between the Tsongol and Tamchinsky (Gusinoozyorsk) datsans. In 1764 the chief lama of the Tsongol Datsan became Supreme Lama of the Buryats of Transbaikalia, having received the title Pandit Hambo Lama ("learned prior"). Starting in 1809, supremacy passed to the priors of the Tamchinsky datsan.
 By 1846, thirty-four datsans had been established in Buryatia. Applying a great deal of effort and material resources, the Buryats managed to import from Tibet, China, and Mongolia a large quantity of esoteric literature and to adopt many living traditions from the Gelugpa lineage and other schools of Buddhism.
 In 1869, the Mongolian lama Choi-Manramba began to lead instruction in Indo-Tibetan medicine at the Tsugol Datsan, and from there it spread.
 In 1878 the Duynhor Kalachakra School was founded at Aga Datsan, and this completed the establishment of the basic schools of spiritual higher education based on the Tibetan model.
 Book printing developed quickly. In 1887, twenty-nine print shops were already in operation, which until their destruction in the 1930s published about 2000 book titles, written in Tibetan and Mongolian.
 At the end of the 19th century, Buddhism began a thorough penetration into Cisbaikalia (now Northern Buryatia), where it met fierce resistance from shamans and Christian missionaries.
 In the late 19th and early 20th centuries, a great renewal movement began in Buryat Buddhism, and it gained additional impetus after the establishment of Soviet power in Buryatia.

To the present day

 In 1918 a law was adopted, the Decree on the Separation of Church from State and School from Church, which abolished religious education. In Buryatia this law came into effect in 1925. It destroyed the spiritual culture of the peoples of the new Soviet state, and for the Buryats specifically it meant the destruction of their Buddhist culture. Spiritual values created and accumulated over centuries were destroyed and erased in a short period of time. Of the forty-seven datsans and dugans operating at the beginning of the 20th century, almost nothing now remains. One thousand eight hundred and sixty-four highly learned lamas were sent to prison, into exile, or to hard labor; hundreds were shot to death.
 In the 1920s some Buryats resettled from Transbaikalia (mostly from Aga) to the Shenehen area of Inner Mongolia, and then continued their Buddhist traditions in addition to those which already existed in the region.
 The Council of People's Commissars of the Buryat Autonomous Soviet Socialist Republic passed a resolution on 2 May 1945 to open a Buddhist temple, Hambyn Sume, in a place called Srednyaya Ivolga. Ivolga Datsan in Buryatia and Aga Datsan in the Aga Buryat national district of Chita Oblast, have been open and operational since 1946.
 In 1991 a religious institution of higher education called Dashi Choynhorlin was opened at Ivolga Datsan for the training of priests, instructors, translators of canonical texts, artists, and iconographers. Training is carried out in accordance with the Goman Datsan monastic education system. In 1991 the number of operational datsans in Buryatia reached twelve.

Local characteristics
Buddhism in Buryatia is the northernmost extension of Vajrayana Buddhism in Central Asia. It is primarily the Gelug tradition from Tibet, although there are signs of influence from the Nyingma tradition as well. Buddhist followers in Buryatia revere the founder of the Gelug school, the great guru Tsongkhapa (called Zonhobo in Buryat), on par with the founder of the entire Buddhist tradition, Shakyamuni Buddha. Gelug adherents in Buryatia prefer to either use this self-designation for the tradition, or the general terms "teachings of the Buddha" or "Mahayana doctrine."

Buryat Buddhism shows slight deviations from general Mahayana tradition mainly in its system of religious practice, in its rituals and magical practices, and are due to the influence of traditional, more ancient and archaic beliefs, practices, and rituals of the Tibetans and of the Buryat-Mongols. In particular, the religious system of Buddhism incorporated and assimilated traditional folk ceremonies, rituals, and beliefs associated with the honoring of ovoos, paying homage to spirits of the land, mountains, rivers, and trees. Among monastic religious practices, those of tantric origin, forming the basis of Vajrayana Buddhism, play an important role. In its philosophical, psychological and ethical teachings, Buryat Buddhism does not differ significantly from the fundamental provisions of Mahayana Buddhism as presented in the Tibetan version of the Buddhist canon referred to as the Kangyur (Ganzhuur in Buryat; 108 volumes) and the Tengyur (Danzhuur in Buryat; 225 volumes).

Buddhism has had a tremendous impact on the development of culture and scholarship among the Buryat-Mongols, particularly on the formation and development of philosophical thought, norms of morality, mental development, fictional literature, art, cooking, and aspects of alternative medicine including chronobiology and bioenergetics.

Among the great variety of religious practices at Buryat datsans, there are six large ceremonies that take place: Sagaalgan (New Year); Duynher (Kalachakra); Gandan-Shunserme (the birth, enlightenment and parinirvana of Shakyamuni Buddha); Maidari-Hural (the anticipated coming of Maitreya, the buddha of the next world epoch); Lhabab-Duysen (Buddha's descent from the heaven called Tushita); and Zul-Hural (commemoration of Tsongkhapa).

Temples and monasteries
Datsans in Buryatia and in the Chita and Irkutsk Oblasts:
 Hambyn-Hure Datsan of Ulan-Ude: city of Ulan-Ude
 Aga Datsan: Chita, Aga Buryat Autonomous Area, village of Aginskoye
 Atsagat Datsan: Republic of Buryatia, village of Naryn-Atsagat
 Kurumkan Datsan: Republic of Buryatia, Kurumkansky (Huramhaanai in Buryat) District, village of Kurumkan
 Sartul-Gegetuy Datsan: Republic of Buryatia, Jidinsky (Zede) District, village of Gegetuy
 Atagan-Dyrestuy Datsan: Republic of Buryatia, Jidinsky (Zede) District, village of Dyrestuy
 Tabangut-Ichotuy Datsan: Republic of Buryatia, Jidinsky (Zede) District, village of Dodo-Ichyotuy
 Egita Datsan: Republic of Buryatia, Yeravninsky (Yaruunyn) District, village of Egita
 Sanaga Datsan: Republic of Buryatia, Zakamensky (Zahaaminai) District, village of Sanaga
 Tseezhe-Burgaltaysky Datsan: Republic of Buryatia, Zakamensky (Zahaaminai) District, village of Ust-Burgaltay
 Ivolga Datsan: Republic of Buryatia, Ivolginsky (Ebilge) District, village of Verkhnyaya Ivolga website
 Yangazhinsky Datsan: Republic of Buryatia, Ivolginsky (Ebilge) District, near Orongoy
 Kizhinga Datsan: Republic of Buryatia, Kizhinginsky (Hezhengyn) District, village of Kizhinga
 Baldan Breybun (Tsongolsky) Datsan: Republic of Buryatia, Kyakhtinsky (Hyaagtyn) District, village of Murochi
 Tugnui Datsan: Republic of Buryatia, Mukhorshibirsky (Muhar-Sheber) District, village of Mukhorshibir
 Okinsky Datsan: Republic of Buryatia, Okinsky (Ahyn) District, village of Orlik
 Atsaysky Datsan: Republic of Buryatia, Selenginsky (Selenge) District, on the A340 highway between the village of Novoselenginsk and the city Gusinoozyorsk
 Tamchinsky (Gusinoozyorsk) Datsan: Republic of Buryatia, Selenginsky (Selenge) District, village of Gusinoye Ozero (Tamcha)
 Kyren Datsan: Republic of Buryatia, Tunkinsky (Tünhen) District, village of Kyren
 Hoymor Datsan: Republic of Buryatia, Tunkinsky (Tünhen) District, Arshan resort
 Ugdan Datsan: Transbaikalia District, Chita Oblast, village of Ugdan
 Ust-Orda (Abaganat) Datsan: Irkutsk Oblast, village of Ust-Orda
 Ana Datsan: Republic of Buryatia, Khorinsky (Hori) District, village of Ana
 Chesan Datsan: Republic of Buryatia, Kizhinginsky (Hezhengyn) District, village of Chesan
 Chita Datsan: Transbaikalia Kray, Chita Oblast, city of Chita
 Tsugol Datsan: Chita Oblast, village of Tsugol

See also
 Agvan Dorzhiev
 Buddhism
 Buddhism by country
 Buddhism in Kalmykia
 Buddhism in Russia
 Damba Ayusheev
 Buddhism in Tuva

References

Bibliography
 Бардуева Т. Пандито Хамбо лама Даши-доржо Итигэлов и обновленческое движение в Бурятии // Вестник Бурятского государственного университета. — Улан-Удэ: Бурятский государственный университет, 2010. — № 8. — С. 165—168. — . (Barduyeva, T.: "Pandito Hambo Lama Dashi-Dorzho Itigelov and the Renewal Movement in Buryatia", Bulletin of the Buryat State University, Ulan-Ude, 2010)
 Ванчикова Ц. П., Чимитдоржин Д. Г. История буддизма в Бурятии: 1945—2000 гг. Изд-во БНЦ СО РАН, 2006 (Vanchikova, Ts. P., Chimitdorzhin, D. G.: The History of Buddhism in Buryatia: 1945-2000, BNTs SO RAN Publishing, 2006)
 Жамсуев Б. Б., Ванчикова Ц. П. Земля Ваджрапани: Буддизм в Забайкалье. Изд-во Феория, 2008 (Zhamsuyev, B. B.; Vanchikova, Ts. P.: The Land of Vajrayana: Buddhism in Transbaikalia, Feoria Publishing, 2008)
 Жуковская Н. Л. Возрождение буддизма в Бурятии: проблемы и перспективы. Российская академия наук, Ин-т этнологии и антропологии, 1997  (Zhokovskaya, N. L.: The Rebirth of Buddhism in Buryatia: Issues and Prospects, Russian Academy of Sciences, Institute of Ethnology and Anthropology, 1997)
 Манзанов Г. Е. Современное состояние религиозности в республике Бурятия // Религиоведение (журнал). — 2005. — № 2. — С. 79—87. — . (Manzanov, G. Ye.: "The Contemporary State of Religion in the Republic of Buryatia," Religious Studies (magazine), 2005)
 Нестёркин С. П. Буддизм в Бурятии: истоки, история, современность: материалы конференции, 23-24 июня 2001 г., Тамчинский дацан. Бурятский научный центр СО РАН, 2002 (Nestyorkin, S. P.: "Buddhism in Buryatia: Sources, History, Modernity," conference materials from 23–24 June 2001 at Tamchinsky datsan, SO RAN Buryat Academic Center, 2002)

External links
 The Buddhist Traditional Sangha of Russia
 official site of the Ivolga Datsan

 
Buddhism in Russia